Beit Jabad is a synagogue in Montevideo, Uruguay. 

This synagogue belongs to the Chabad movement. It is located in the neighbourhood of Pocitos.

See also
 Ajdut Israel - Beit Jabad Synagogue, Punta del Este
 List of synagogues in Uruguay

References

External links
 Beit Jabad Uruguay  
Ashkenazi Jewish culture in Uruguay
Chabad in South America
Hasidic synagogues
Pocitos, Montevideo
Synagogues in Montevideo
Orthodox Judaism in Uruguay